The 2003–04 Gamma Ethniki was the 21st season since the official establishment of the third tier of Greek football in 1983. Kastoria was crowned champion, thus winning promotion to Beta Ethniki. AEL also won promotion as a runner-up, and Ilisiakos was also promoted after defeating PAS Giannina 3-1 in a single play-off match at Pyrgos Stadium between the 14th placed team of Beta Ethniki and the 3rd placed team of Gamma Ethniki.

Chalkida, Leonidio, Pontiakos Nea Santa and Kilkisiakos were relegated to Delta Ethniki.

League table

Promotion play-off

Top scorers

References

Third level Greek football league seasons
3
Greece